Jito Kok (born 23 March 1994) is a Dutch professional basketball player who plays for Heroes Den Bosch of the BNXT League. Standing at 206 cm (6 ft 9 in), Kok plays as center. He also plays for the Netherlands national team.

Professional career
On 14 June 2016, Kok signed a one-year deal with Lavrio B.C. of the Greek Basket League. In February 2017, Kok signed with AVIS Rapla of the Estonian KML.

On 11 July 2018, Kok returned to his native country by signing with Dutch Windmills of the Dutch Basketball League (DBL). On 10 April 2019, Windmills withdrew from the DBL due to its financial problems. 

On 25 April, Kok signed with Kangoeroes Mechelen. Mechelen was eliminated in the playoff quarterfinals as the eight seed.

On 14 May 2020, Kok signed a temporary contract with BG Göttingen of the German Basketball Bundesliga.

On 20 June 2021 he signed with Spirou of the BNXT League. He averaged 9.4 points, 5.4 rebounds and 1 block per game in 31 games in the 2021–22 season.

On 29 June 2022, Kok signed a two-year contract with the defending Dutch champions Heroes Den Bosch.

National team career
Kok represents the Netherlands national basketball team. On 30 July 2017, Kok was involved in an incident in which he was punched in the face by Italy's Danilo Gallinari during a friendly match.

References

1994 births
Living people
BG Göttingen players
Centers (basketball)
Dutch Basketball League players
Dutch expatriate basketball people in Belgium
Dutch expatriate basketball people in Germany
Dutch expatriate basketball people in Spain
Dutch expatriate basketball people in the United States
Dutch men's basketball players
Dutch Windmills players
Dutch expatriate basketball people in Estonia
Heroes Den Bosch players
Kangoeroes Basket Mechelen players
Lavrio B.C. players
Power forwards (basketball)
Rapla KK players
San Diego Toreros men's basketball players
Spirou Charleroi players